Andrea Masciarelli (born 2 September 1982) is an Italian cyclist. He rode in the 2009 Giro d'Italia and 2010 Giro d'Italia.

Palmares
2008
3rd Giro del Veneto

References

1982 births
Living people
Italian male cyclists
Sportspeople from Pescara
Cyclists from Abruzzo